The Dzuarikau–Tskhinvali pipeline is a natural gas pipeline running from the village of Dzuarikau in North Ossetia to Tskhinvali, South Ossetia. Construction started in 2006, and gas supplies started in September 2009.

History
Construction of the pipeline was planned for a long time and it started in December 2006.  It was launched on 26 August 2009.

Previously, South Ossetia was supplied from the Agara-Tskhinvali leg of the Tbilisi-Kutaisi trunk system of Georgia.  After the Georgian-Ossetian conflict, supplies to South Ossetia from Georgia were cut off. According to Georgia, the cause was a damaged section of the pipeline within South Ossetia, while Russia denied the damage and accused Georgia of the deliberate cutoff. Supplies were restored in January 2009.

Technical description 
Around  of the pipeline is in South Ossetian territory. It has been reported that the pipeline may be the located the highest in the world. The cost of construction was 15 billion rubles (US$476 million). The pipeline is operated by Gazprom Transgaz Stavropol, a subsidiary of Gazprom. It was built by Stroyprogress.

Political significance
The pipeline was said to be important for the de facto independence of South Ossetia, because it "shakes off the last levers exerted by its unfriendly neighbour".  The Georgian foreign ministry protested against the launch of the pipeline.

See also

 Energy in Georgia (country)
 Energy in Russia

References 

Energy infrastructure completed in 2009
Natural gas pipelines in Russia
Natural gas pipelines in Georgia (country)
Gazprom pipelines
Dzau District
Tskhinvali District
Buildings and structures in Tskhinvali
Buildings and structures in South Ossetia